Adult Contemporary is a chart published by Billboard ranking the top-performing songs in the United States in the adult contemporary music (AC) market.  In 2011, eight different songs topped the chart in 52 issues of the magazine, based on weekly airplay data from radio stations compiled by Nielsen Broadcast Data Systems.

On the first chart of the year, the number one spot was held by Mariah Carey with "Oh Santa!", the song's third consecutive week at number one.  It remained at the top of the chart for one further week before being replaced by the band Train's song "Hey, Soul Sister".  Train's song had spent 19 weeks at number one during the previous year, and its return to the top spot took its total of 22 weeks at number one, the second-highest figure at the time for the AC listing behind only Uncle Kracker's version of "Drift Away", which spent 28 weeks in the top spot in 2003 and 2004.

Two artists held the top spot between them from early February to early November, with the exception of a single week.  Bruno Mars topped the chart for 20 non-consecutive weeks with "Just the Way You Are" and Adele spent 19 consecutive weeks at number one with "Rolling in the Deep".  Both songs also topped Billboards all-genres chart, the Hot 100, as did Katy Perry's "Firework", the only song to interrupt Mars and Adele's nine-month domination of the AC number one position.  All three songs topped the AC chart several months after peaking on the Hot 100, reflecting a trend for songs to cross over to the slower-moving adult contemporary radio format after their pop success had peaked.  "Just the Way You Are"'s 20-week run at number one set a new record for the longest spell atop the AC chart by an artist's debut single, breaking a record previously jointly held by Colbie Caillat and Daniel Powter.  Adele returned to the top spot for a single week in the issue of Billboard dated December 3 with "Someone like You", making her the only artist to have two AC number ones in 2011, and tying Mars for the highest number of weeks spent at number one by an act during the year.  Having begun with a Christmas-themed song by Mariah Carey at number one, 2011 ended with a cover version of another in the top spot, as Michael Bublés recording of Carey's 1994 song "All I Want for Christmas Is You" topped the chart for the last four weeks of the year.  The song was part of a long-running trend of Christmas-themed songs topping the AC chart at the end of the year, reflecting the fact that adult contemporary radio stations usually switch to playing exclusively festive songs in December.

Chart history

See also
2011 in music
List of artists who reached number one on the U.S. Adult Contemporary chart

References

2011
Number-one adult contemporary singles
United States Adult Contemporary